Hiếu Liêm is a rural commune of Bắc Tân Uyên District, Bình Dương Province in Southeast Vietnam.

Hiếu Liêm was originally the name of a former district in Phước Thành Province in the Southeast region in South Vietnam. The district capital lay in Lạc An, now Hiếu Liêm commune. It was dissolved and merged into Tân Uyên District in 1965.

References 

Populated places in Bình Dương province